Baissea axillaris is a plant in the family Apocynaceae.

Description
Baissea axillaris is a climbing shrub that intertwines into the surrounding vegetation for support. Its flowers feature a yellow, orange or white corolla, sometimes with red spots or stripes inside. Local traditional medicinal uses include as a treatment for kidney problems and colic and as a diuretic.

Distribution and habitat
Baissea axillaris is native to an area of tropical Africa from Senegal east and south to Angola. Its habitat is in forests from sea level to  altitude.

References

axillaris
Plants used in traditional African medicine
Flora of Africa
Plants described in 1876